"Got It Goin' On" is the debut single by Australian group Human Nature. The song peaked at No. 19 in Australia and No. 30 in New Zealand.

It was released internationally under the name "You Got It".

Track listing
CD single (662472 2)
 "Got It Goin' On" – 3:53
 "Sleepin' Alone" – 3:58
 "Got It Goin' On" (Nuff Club Mix) – 7:22
 "Got It Goin' On" (Lounge Mix) – 4:41
 "Got It Goin' On" (Nuff Dub Mix) – 7:19

Charts
"Got It Goin' On" debuted at No. 48 in Australia before rising to a peak of No. 19.

Awards
"Got It Goin' On" delivered Human Nature its first ARIA Award for “Best New Talent” at the 1996 awards. It lost out to "Fool for You" by Monique Brumby.

|-
|1996
| "Got It Goin' On"
|Best New Talent
| 
|}

References

Human Nature (band) songs
1996 songs
1996 debut singles
Sony Music Australia singles
Songs written by Paul Begaud
Songs written by Andrew Tierney
Songs written by Michael Tierney (musician)